Dan Mallin is a Minnesota entrepreneur, Co-Founder and Managing Partner of Magnet 360, Co-Founder of The Minnesota Cup, Entrepreneur-in-Residence of the Gary S. Holmes Center for Entrepreneurship at the Carlson School of Management, and a Board Member of various organizations.

Dan spent the early years of his career at 3M, as a Technologist Manager. In 1995, Mallin Co-founded Imaginet LLC., a consultancy providing internet-based solutions, with business partner Scott Litman. They sold the company to J. Walter Thompson in 2001, where Mallin then became the North American COO of the company.

Together, Mallin and Litman founded Spot Buy Spot in 1996, a company that developed IT services and Software to help media buyers manage inventory in the advertising industry. The company was eventually sold to Comcast in 2007.

In 2005, Mallin and Litman co-founded The Minnesota Cup. The competition was started to promote ground-breaking business ideas and is opened to all Minnesotans. Winning participants are awarded a share of over $300,000 in cash prizes, opportunities to meet local investors and get exposure in the media. The intention of the Minnesota Cup is to promote the discovery and commercialization of innovative, entrepreneurial ideas in the state of Minnesota. Since its founding, it has become the largest statewide business plan competition in the United States. Over 10,000 Minnesotans have participated, with top finishers having raised nearly $170 million in new capital.

Mallin has been recognized and awarded by multiple institutions, including multiple 3M awards, Ernst & Young’s Entrepreneur of the Year, Business Journal’s 40 Under 40, Twin Cities Business 200 People to Know, The Real Power 50 from Minnesota Business Magazine, and the Titans of Technology.

In September 2015, Mallin was a recipient of University of Minnesota's Outstanding Achievement Award. This award is given to University of Minnesota graduates who have attained exceptional distinction in their professional career or in public service, as well as demonstrated significant leadership on a community, state, national or international level.

References

Living people
University of Minnesota alumni
American businesspeople
Carlson School of Management alumni
University of Minnesota faculty
Year of birth missing (living people)